Adrian Holmes (born March 31, 1974) is a Canadian actor. He is known for his work on the Bravo television series 19-2, for which he won a Canadian Screen Award in 2017. He is also known for playing the roles of Uncle Phil in the Fresh Prince of Bel-Air reboot Bel-Air and Robert April in Star Trek: Strange New Worlds.

Early life
Holmes was born to Bajan parents in Wrexham, North Wales, and moved with his family to Vancouver, British Columbia, when he was five. He studied nursing at Langara College, in part to appease his mother, who felt he needed a backup plan if his acting career was unsuccessful.

Career

Holmes has had a long career, but is best known for his television roles, such as Basqat on Smallville, Marcus Mitchell on True Justice and Frank Pike on Arrow. His most notable role is Nick Barron in the English Language version of 19-2 on Bravo, which garnered him a Canadian Screen Award for Best Actor in a Continuing Leading Dramatic Role in 2017. His film work includes Red Riding Hood, Elysium and The Cabin in the Woods.
In 2021 Adrian was cast as Uncle Phil in the show Bel air, a reboot turned series drama of The Fresh Prince of Bel Air. Will Smith gave him the stamp of approval. He has recently been cast as the first live-action version of Robert April, the first captain of the USS Enterprise, in Star Trek: Strange New Worlds. (April had previously appeared in animated form in "The Counter-Clock Incident", the final episode of Star Trek: The Animated Series, where he was voiced by James Doohan.)

Filmography

Film

Television

Video games

Awards and nominations

References

External links

Living people
Canadian male television actors
Canadian male voice actors
20th-century Canadian male actors
21st-century Canadian male actors
Male actors from Vancouver
Place of birth missing (living people)
1974 births
Black Canadian male actors
Black British actors
Welsh emigrants to Canada
Best Actor in a Drama Series Canadian Screen Award winners
Canadian people of Barbadian descent
Welsh people of Barbadian descent
Langara College people